Steropoides is an ichnogenus of Prehistoric mammal footprint.

References

Mammal trace fossils